Oonops domesticus is a tiny spider (males about 1.5 mm, females 2 mm) from Western Europe to Russia. It is of a bleak light red, with a reddish to whitish abdomen. It is found only in buildings, where it builds a retreat in corners and between old paper. It hunts at night, probably with booklice their common prey. The translucent flat egg sac contains only two eggs.

It is very similar to the closely related O. pulcher, but has five tibial spine pairs instead of four. O. pulcher is found outdoors.

Name 
The species name domesticus is Latin for "home".

References 

Oonopidae
Spiders of Europe
Spiders of Russia
Spiders described in 1916